Tobalaba is a station on the Santiago Metro in Chile, the northern terminus of Line 4 and is the closest station to the Costanera Center.

The Line 1 station was opened on 22 August 1980 as part of the extension of the line from Salvador to Escuela Militar. It became an interchange station between Line 1 and the Line 4 on 30 November 2005, when the section of Line 4 between Tobalaba and Grecia was opened, and the appearance of the station was altered.

References

1980 establishments in Chile
Railway stations opened in 1980
Santiago Metro stations
Santiago Metro Line 1
Santiago Metro Line 4